This is a list of television series produced, distributed or owned by Sony Pictures Television, a Sony Pictures Entertainment company.

Sony Pictures Television 
Formerly known as Screen Gems (1948–1974), Columbia Pictures Television (1974–2001), and Columbia TriStar Television (1994–2002).

TriStar Television

Gemstone Studios

Embassy Row 
Formerly known as Diplomatic until 2005.
 2 Minute Drill (2000–2001)
 Smush (2001) (in association with Greengrass Productions, Jellyvision and USA Network)
 Pepsi's Play for a Billion (2003–2004) (in association with the PepsiCo)
 Studio 7 (2004) (in association with Monkey Entertainment)
 My Kind of Town (2005; in association with Monkey Kingdom and Greengrass Productions)
 The 9 on Yahoo! (2006–2008)
 Chain Reaction (2006–2007; in association with Sony Pictures Television and GSN)
 Fast Cars & Superstars: The Gillette Young Guns Celebrity Race (2007)
 Grand Slam (2007; in association with Monkey Kingdom, Sony Pictures Television and GSN)
 The World Series of Pop Culture (2006–2007; in association with VH1)
 Fast Cars and Superstars: The Gillette Young Guns Celebrity Race (2007)
 Power of 10 (2007–2008; in association with Sony Pictures Television)
 The Newlywed Game (2009–2013; in association with Sony Pictures Television and GSN)
 Make My Day (2009; in association with Monkey Kingdom, Sony Pictures Television and TV Land Originals)
 Watch What Happens Live with Andy Cohen (2009–present) (in association with Sony Pictures Television and Bravo Media Productions)
 Hidden Agenda (2010; in association with Sony Pictures Television and GSN)
 The Glee Project (2011–2012) (in association with Ryan Murphy Productions and Oxygen Media Productions)
 Talking Dead (2011–present)
 Comedians in Cars Getting Coffee (2012–present; in association with Sony Pictures Television)
 Kathy (2012–2013; in association with Sony Pictures Television, Donut Run, and Bravo Originals)
 The American Bible Challenge (2012–2014; in association with Sony Pictures Television, Relativity Media, and GSN Originals)
 The Substitute (2011; in association with Phear Creative and MTV Production Development)
 The Pyramid (2012; in association with Sony Pictures Television and GSN Originals)
 The Job (2013; in association with Sony Pictures Television)
 Crowd Rules (2013)
 Cutthroat Kitchen (2013–2017)
 Shark After Dark (2013–present)  
 Talking Bad (2013)
 Fashion Queens (2013–2015; co-produced by True Entertainment and Bravo Originals)
 Beat Bobby Flay (2013/2014–present; co produced by Rock Shrimp Productions)
 Bates Motel: After Hours (2014)
 Street Art Throwdown (2015; co-produced by Sony Pictures Television, Ugly Pretty Productions and Oxygen Media Productions)
 Garbage Time with Katie Nolan (2015–2017)
 Bianca (2015–present; co-produced by Lucky Gal Productions)
 The Grace Helbig Show (2015)
 Recipe for Deception (2016; in association with Realizer Productions and Bravo Media Productions)
 VH1 Live! (2016)
 Good Morning Football (2016–present)
 Comedy Knockout (2016–present; in association with TruTV and 3 Arts Entertainment)
 After Trek (2017–2018)
 Talking with Chris Hardwick (2017)
 My Brother, My Brother and Me (2017)  
 Beyond Stranger Things (2017)
 Bravo's Play by Play (2018–present) (in association with Most Talkative Productions and Bravo Media Productions
 Unapologetic with Aisha Tyler (2018–present)
 Below the Belt (2018–present)
 The Kyle Brandt Football Experience (2018)
 Kandi Koated Nights (2018) (in association with Sony Pictures Television, Kandi Koated Entertainment, TTucker Productions and Bravo Media Productions)
 Who Wants to Be a Millionaire (2020–2021) (with Valleycrest Productions and Kimmelot)
 Prime Rewind: Inside The Boys (2020–present)
 Kal Penn Approves This Message (2020–present)
 Doing the Most with Phoebe Robinson (2021–present) (in association with Tiny Reparations and Comedy Partners)
 Tug of Words (2021–present)

Adelaide Productions 
Note: Adelaide serves as copyright holder and producer of the following shows, but bears the logo of the respective SPE branch.

Spelling-Goldberg Productions

TOY Productions

Rastar Television

ELP Communications 
Formerly known as T.A.T. Communications Company (1974–1982), Embassy Television (1982–1986) and Embassy Communications (1986–1988).

Notes: * (Production assumed by Columbia Pictures Television in 1988) Bold (Production assumed by Columbia TriStar Television in 1994)

Tandem Productions

Merv Griffin Enterprises 
Formerly known as Merv Griffin Productions until 1984.

Danny Arnold Productions 
 Barney Miller (1975–1982, produced by Four D Productions)
 Fish (1977–1978, produced by the Mimus Corporation)
 A.E.S. Hudson Street (1978, produced by the Triseme Corporation)
 Joe Bash (1986, produced by Tetagram Ltd.)

The Guber-Peters Entertainment Company 
Note: Formerly Chuck Barris Productions from 1965 to 1982; 1984–1987 and Barris Productions from 1987 to 1989.

Jack Barry Productions/Barry & Enright Productions 
 The Honeymoon Game (1970 unsold pilot) (In association with Metromedia)
 Juvenile Jury (1970–1971)
 The Reel Game (1971) (in association with Four Star Television and ABC)
 Make the Scene (1972 unsold pilot)
 Hollywood's Talking (1973)
 Countdown (1974 unsold pilot)
 Blank Check (1975)
 People Are Funny (1975 unsold pilot) (In association with Jim Victory Television)
 Hollywood Connection (1977–1978) (In association with KTLA)
 We've Got Your Number (1975 unsold pilot)
 Double Cross (1975 game show unsold pilot)
 Break the Bank (1976–1977) (served as both network and syndication)
 Way Out Games (1976–1977) (In association with MGM Television; currently owned by Warner Bros. Television)
 Tic-Tac-Dough (1978–1986 only)
 People Watchers (1970s unsold pilot) (In association with WISH-TV)
 Decisions, Decisions (1979? unsold pilot)
 Joker, Joker, Joker (1979–1981) (Children's edition of The Joker's Wild)
 Play the Percentages (1980)
 The Bert Convy Show (1980)
 Bullseye (1980–1982)
 Hot Potato (1984)
 All About Us (1985) (daily magazine show hosted by Ron Hendren; part of the INDAY package distributed by LBS Communications)
 Bumper Stumpers (1987–1990) (In association with the Global Television Network, Wink Martindale Enterprises, and the USA Network)
 Chain Letters (1987–1990) (In association with ITV Tyne Tees and Action Time)
 Juvenile Jury (1983–1984 and 1989–1991)
 All About the Opposite Sex (1990)
 Hold Everything! (1990)

Stewart Television 
Note: Formerly known as Bob Stewart Productions.
 Eye Guess (1966–1969)
 The Face Is Familiar (1966)
 Personality (1967–1969)
 You're Putting Me On (1969)
 Three on a Match (1971–1974)
 Pyramid
 The $10,000 Pyramid (1973–1976)
 The $20,000 Pyramid (1976–1980)
 The $25,000 Pyramid (1974–1979) (currently owned by CBS Media Ventures)
 The $50,000 Pyramid (1981)
 The (New) $25,000 Pyramid (1982–1988)
 The $100,000 Pyramid (1985–1988) (originally distributed by 20th Century Fox Television)
 The $100,000 Pyramid (1991)
 Jackpot! (1974–1975, 1985–1988, 1989–1990)
 Winning Streak (1974–1975)
 Blankety Blanks (1975)
 Shoot for the Stars (1977)
 Pass the Buck (1978)
 The Love Experts (1978–1979) (currently owned by CBS Media Ventures)
 Chain Reaction (1980, 1986–1991)
 Go (1983–1984)
 Double Talk (1986; revival of Shoot for the Stars)

2waytraffic 
 Winning Lines (1999–2004)
 Who Wants to Be a Millionaire: Canadian Edition (2000) (co-production with CTV Television Network, Valleycrest Productions, and Buena Vista Television)
 The People Versus (2000–2002)
 Quiz $ Millionaire (2000–2013)
 Brainiest (2001–2002)
 Grand Slam (2003)
 You Are What You Eat (2004–2007, 2009)
 That's the Question (2006–2007) (co-production with Scott Sternberg Productions)
 Take It or Leave It (2006–2008) (co-production with Intellygents)
 That's the Question (British) (2007) (co-production with Intellygents)
 Last One Standing (2007–2008)
 All Star Mr & Mrs (2008–2016)
 Qui veut gagner des millions ? (2008–present)
 Who Wants to Be a Millionaire? New Zealand (2008)
 Pyramid (2009–2014)
 Who Wants to Be a Millionaire? (Philippine) (2009–2015)

Fable Pictures

Eleventh Hour Films

Curio Pictures

Teleset

Victory Television

Stolen Picture

Bad Wolf

Eleven Film

Sony Pictures Television Nonfiction

19 Entertainment

 Miami 7 (1999) 
 L.A. 7 (2000)  
 S Club 7 Go Wild! (2000) 
 S Club Search (2001)  
 Hollywood 7 (2001) 
 Viva S Club (2002)
 American Juniors (2003)
 All American Girl  (2003)
 I Dream (2004)

Sharp Entertainment 
 100 Greatest Red Carpet Moments (2004)
 30 Even Scarier Movie Moments (2006)
 Videos That Rocked the World (2007–2008)
 Confessions of a Matchmaker (2007)
 NOFX: Backstage Passport (2008)
 Ask Aida (2008–2009)
 Man v. Food (2008–present)
 Underdog to Wonderdog (2009–2010)
 The Lottery Changed My Life (2009–2011)
 Most Terrifying Places in America (2009–2018)
 Punkin Chunkin (2010)
 Extreme Couponing (2010–2012)
 Bert the Conqueror (2010–2016)
 Flying Anvils (2011)
 Celebrity Nightmares Decoded (2011)
 Man v. Food Nation (2011–2012)
 Rattlesnake Republic (2011–2014)
 Call of the Wildman (2011–2014)
 My Crazy Obsession (2012–2013)
 Doomsday Preppers (2012–2014)
 Adam Richman's Best Sandwich in America(2012)
 Fast Food Mania(2012)
 Property Wars(2012–2013)
 Toy Hunter(2012–2014)
 Extreme Cheapskates(2012–2014)
 Dates from Hell (2012–2014)
 Fish Tank Kings (2012)
 Head Games (2012)
 Bad Ink(2013–2014)
 Dig Wars (2013)
 90 Day Fiancé (2014–present)
 Secret Lives of Stepford Wives (2014)
 Outrageous (2014)
 Frankenfood (2014)
 Sold on the Spot (2014)
 101 More Amazing Places to Chowdown (2014)
 Tethered (2014)
 Momsters: When Moms Go Bad (2014–2015)
 101 Amazing Thrills (2015)
 Hack My Life (2015–2018)
 90 Day Fiancé: Happily Ever After? (2016–present)
 90 Day Fiancé: Before the 90 Days (2017–present)
 90 Day Fiancé: What Now?  (2017–present)
 Love After Lockup (2018–present)
 Best Places to Pig Out  (2018–present)
 90 Day Fiancé: Pillow Talk (2019–present)
 90 day:The Family Chantel (2019–present)
 90 Day Fiancé: The Other Way(2019–present)
 90 Day Fiancé: Just Landed (2019)
 Marrying Millions(2019–present)
 Ghosted: Love Gone Missing  (2019–2021)
 90 Day Fiancé: Self-Quarantined  (2020–present)
 Darcey & Stacey (2020–present)
 90 Day Fiancé: B90 Strikes Back! (2020–present)
 90 Day Fiancé: HEA Strikes Back! (2020–present)
 90 Day Bares All (2021–present) 
 90 Day Diaries (2021–present) 
 90 Day: The Single Life (2021–present)
 90 Day Fiancé: TOW Strikes Back! (2021–present) 
 90 Day Fiance: The Other Way Strikes Back! (2021–present)
 90 Day Bares All (2021–present)
 90 Day Fiancé: Love Games (2021–present)
 90 Day: Foody Call (2021)
 90 Day Lovers' Collection (2021)
 Love in Paradise: The Caribbean, A 90 Day Story (2021–present)
 Loren & Alexei: After the 90 Days (2022–present)
 David & Annie: After the 90 Days (2022–present)
 Love Off the Grid (2022–present)

The Intellectual Property Corporation (IPC) 
 Leah Remini: Scientology and the Aftermath (2016–19) 
 Active Shooter: America Under Fire (2017) 
 Mind Field (2017–2019) 
 Lost Gold  (2017–2019)
 Operation Odessa (2018)
 Sticker Shock (2018)
 Kingpin (2018)
 ELEAGUE The Challenger: Street Fighter V (2018)
 Price of Duty (2018)
 Cults and Extreme Belief (2018)
 Kids Behind Bars: Life or Parole (2018–present)
 The Substitute (2019–2021)
 Injustice with Nancy Grace (2019–2020) (co-production with Eureka Productions)
 Free Meek (2019) 
 Fine Young Criminals (2019–present)
 America's Most Musical Family (2019–2020)
 This Giant Beast That is the Global Economy (2019–present )
 1989: The Year That Made Us (2019)
 Fortune Fights (2019)
 Notorious (2019)
 Empires of New York (2020)
 We're Here (2020–present)
 Indian Matchmaking (2020–present) 
 Selena + Chef (2020–present) 
 The Last Narc (2020)
 The Swamp (2020)
 This Is Paris (2020)
 Cooking with Paris (2021)
 Night Stalker: The Hunt for a Serial Killer (2021)
 The Curse of Von Dutch (2021)
 How To: Olympics (2021)
 The D'Amelio Show (2021–present)
 12 Hours With (2021)
 Secrets of Playboy (2022)
 Restaurant Rivals: Irvine vs. Taffer (2022–present)
 Death in the Dorms (2023)

B17 Entertainment
 Fluffy Breaks Even (2015–2017) 
 Broke A$$ Game Show (2015–2016) 
 Fright Club (2017–2018) 
 Make Up or Break Up (2017–2018) 
 Nail the Look (2017–2018) 
 Help Us Get Married (2018) 
 Fashion 5 Ways (2018)  
 Confetti (2018–2019)
 Do It Duo (2018–2019)    
 Chasing the Cure (2019)   
 Ruby's Gems (2019)  
 Ruth & Ruby Ultimate Sleepover (2019–2020)   
 Last Night's Late Night (2020)   
 The Great Gift Exchange (2020)   
 The Great Debate (2020) 
 Post Malone's Celebrity World Pong League (2020)
 The Daily Chill (2020)
 Celebrity Substitute (2020)
 Thanks a Million (2020–2021)
 Here for It with Avani Gregg (2020–2021)
 Pindrop(2021)
Baketopia (2021)
History of Swear Words (2021)
Craftopia (2021–2022)
The Final Straw (2022)
 Hungry for Answers (2022–present )
 Inside Eats with Rhett & Link (2022–present)
 Non-Fungible Planet (2022–present)
 From YouTube to You (2022–present)
 JoJo Goes (2022–present)
 The Big Tiny Food Face-Off (2022–present)
 Amityville An Origin Story (2023)

Sony Pictures Television International 
Formerly known as Columbia Pictures International Television and Columbia TriStar International Television (1992–2002).

Silver River Productions 
 Respectable (2006)
 Pulling (2006–2009)
 Say No to the Knife (2007)
 The Diets That Time Forgot (2008)
 The Supersizers... (2008–2009)
 Natural Born Sellers (2008)
 How TV Changed Britain (2008)
 Grow Your Own Drugs (2009–2010)
 I'm Running Sainsbury's (2009)
 Kevin McCoy's Grand Tour of Europe (2009)
 Little Crackers (2010–2012) (co-production with Tiger Aspect Productions, Sprout Pictures, Renegade Pictures, Avalon Television, Blue Door Adventures, Can Communicate and Phil Mclntyre Pictures)
 A Question of Taste (2012)
 What Makes a Masterpiece (2012)
 Hidden Talent (2012)
 Antiques Uncovered (2012)
 Harlots, Housewives & Heroines: A 17th Century History for Girls (2012)
 Cherry Healey: Old Before My Time (2013)
 Shut Your Facebook (2014)
 The Big Allotment Challenge (2014–2015)
 Nick & Margaret: Too Many Immigrants? (2014)
 Russia's Lost Princesses (2014)
 Dancing Cheek to Cheek: An Intimate History of Dance (2014)
 Confessions of a Copper (2014)

Left Bank Pictures

Electric Ray

Stellify Media 
 Can't Touch This (2016)
 Goodbye House (2017)
 Don't Say It... Bring It! (2017)
 In Solitary: The Anti-Social Experiment (2017)
 Blind Date (2017–2018) (with So Television and Olga TV)
 Blind Date Ireland (2017)
 Beauty Queen and Single (2017–2019)
 Who Wants to Be a Millionaire? (2018–present) (with Sony Pictures Television)
 Gino's Win Your Wish List (2018–2021)
 Celebs in Solitary (2018)
 Parents' Evening (2018–2019)
 Hot Right Now (2018)
 Flinch (2019)
 There's No Place Like Tyrone (2019)
 Secret Body (2019)
 Pretty Single (2020)
 Celebrity Snoop Dogs (2020)
 Who Wants To Be A Millionaire: The Million Pound Question (2020)
 Farm to Feast: Best Menu Wins (2021–present)
 Fastest Finger First (2022–present) (with Sony Pictures Television)

Sony Pictures Television Kids

Sony Pictures Television - U.S. Networks

Game Show Enterprises

Crunchyroll Studios

Sony Pictures Animation

PlayStation Productions

Sony Wonder Television 
In 2000, Sony Music sold the television assets of Sony Wonder to TV-Loonland AG. As part of the sale, Sony kept the North American home video and international audio rights to its series. Sony Wonder's television library is currently owned by M4E AG, a subsidiary of Studio 100.

Television films and specials

Sony Pictures Television 
 Tales of Frankenstein (1958)
 Bitter Heritage (1958)
 Scalplock (1966)
 Shadow on the Land (1968)
 Three's a Crowd (1969)
 In Name Only (1969)
 Gidget Grows Up (1969)
 The Feminist and the Fuzz (1971) 
 Black Noon (1971)
 Brian's Song (1971)
 The Sheriff (1971)
 Gidget Gets Married (1972)  
 Call Holme (1972)
 The Catcher (1972)
 Man on a String (1972)
 Call Her Mom (1972)
 The Cat Creature (1973)
 Jarrett (1973) 
 The Girl on the Late, Late Show (1974)
 QB VII (1974)  
 Sorority Kill (1974)
 The Last Angry Man (1974)
 The Story of Jacob and Joseph (1974)
 The Last Survivors (1975)
 The First 36 Hours of Dr. Durant (1975)
 A Matter of Wife... and Death (1975)
 Journey from Darkness (1975)
 Medical Story (1975)
 Cop on the Beat (1975)
 The Turning Point of Jim Malloy (1975)
 The Owl and the Pussycat (1975)
 Cage Without a Key (1975) 
 Valley Forge (1975)
 Kiss Me, Kill Me (1976)
 The Lindbergh Kidnapping Case (1976)
 The Quest (1976)
 The Quest: The Longest Drive (1976)
 The Quest: The Longest Drive 2 (1976)
 Banjo Hackett: Roamin’ Free (1976)
 The Story of David (1976)   
 Contract on Cherry Street (1977)
 Cover Girls (1977)
 The Making of 'The Deep''' (1977)  
 The Father Knows Best Reunion (1977)
 Kill Me If You Can (1977)
 Corey: For the People (1977)
 Roger & Harry: The Mitera Target (1977)
 The Magnificent Magical Magnet of Santa Mesa (1977)
 Never Con a Killer (1977)
 A Killing Affair (1977)  
 In the Glitter Palace (1977)
 The Deadly Triangle (1977)
 The Last Hurrah (1977)
 Father Knows Best: Home for Christmas (1977)
 Ziegfeld: The Man and His Women (1978)  
 Doctors' Private Lives (1978) 
 The Courage and the Passion (1978)
 To Kill a Cop (1978)
 Crisis in Sun Valley (1978)
 Keefer (1978)
 Go West, Young Girl (1978)  
 Last of the Good Guys (1978)
 Space Force (1978)
 More Than Friends (1978)
 A Fire in the Sky (1978)
 Goldie and the Boxer (1979)
 Undercover with the KKK (1979) 
 A Shining Season (1979) 
 Institute for Revenge (1979) 
 Women at West Point (1979)
 From Here to Eternity (1979)
 The Incredible Journey of Doctor Meg Laurel (1979)  
 The Legend of the Golden Gun (1979)  
 Fast Friends (1979)
 Pleasure Cove (1979)
 The Billion Dollar Threat (1979)  
 The Child Stealer (1979)
 Breaking Up is Hard to Do (1979)
 The Night the City Screamed (1980)
 Police Story: Confessions of a Lady Cop (1980)
 Alex and the Doberman Gang (1980)
 Detour to Terror (1980) 
 Reunion (1980)
 To Find My Son (1980)
 Beulah Land (1980) 
 Power (1980)
 Once Upon a Spy (1980)
 The Curse of King Tut's Tomb (1980) 
 Terror Among Us (1981)
 Fallen Angel (1981) 
 The Oklahoma City Dolls (1981)
 Family Reunion (1981)  
 Goldie and the Boxer Go to Hollywood (1981)
 Dear Teacher (1981)
 Elvis and the Beauty Queen (1981)  
 Goliath Awaits (1981)
 Ivanhoe (1982) (distribution only)
 Money on the Side (1982) 
 The Shadow Riders (1982)  
 The Neighborhood (1982)
 Life of the Party: The Story of Beatrice (1982)
 Ain't Misbehavin' (1982)
 Lights! Camera! Annie! (1982, with Rastar Films)
 The Blue and the Gray (1982)
 The Hunchback of Notre (1982) (distribution only)
 I, Desire (1982)
 Murder Me, Murder You (1983) 
 Running Out (1983)
 Sadat (1983)  
 Malibu (1983)
 Cocaine and Blue Eyes (1983)  
 The Master of Ballantrae (1984) (distribution only)
 More Than Murder (1984)
 A Touch of Scandal (1984)
 It Came Upon the Midnight Clear (1984)
 Robert Kennedy and His Times (1985)
 Deceptions (1985) 
 Hell Town (1985)
 Deadly Messages (1985)
 Jenny's War (1985)
 The Eagle and the Bear (1985)
 The Steel Collar Man (1985)
 Brotherly Love (1985)
 Alice in Wonderland (1985) (distribution only)
 Reunion at Fairborough (1985) (distribution only)
 The Other Lover (1985) 
 Gidget's Summer Reunion (1985)  
 Robert Kennedy and His Times (1985)  
 I Dream of Jeannie... Fifteen Years Later (1985)
 A Winner Never Quits (1986)
 The Return of Mickey Spillane's Mike Hammer (1986)
 There Must Be a Pony (1986)
 Pleasures (1986)
 Picnic (1986)
 Stranded (1986)
 Miracle of the Heart: A Boys Town Story (1986)
 Kate's Secret (1986) 
 The Canterville Ghost (1986)
 Passion Flower (1986)
 Outrage! (1986)  
 Intimate Encounters (1986) 
 There Must Be a Pony (1986) 
 Still Crazy Like a Fox (1987)   
 Three Wishes fod Jamie (1987)
 Hammer: The Studio That Dripped Blood! (1987)
 Police Story: The Freeway Killings (1987)
 Something Is Out There (1988)  
 Police Story: The Watch Commander (1988)
 Out of Time (1988) 
 Weekend War (1988)
 Maigret (1988)
 Freedom Fighter (1988)
 Police Story: Monster Manor (1988)
 Police Story: Burnout (1988)
 Police Story: Gladiator School (1988)
 Intrigue (1988)
 The Diamond Trap (1988)
 Higher Ground (1988)
 The People Across the Lake (1988) 
 The Taking of Flight 847: The Uli Derickson Story (1988)
 Police Story: Cop Killers (1988)
 The Caine Mutiny Court-Martial (1988)  
 Mike Hammer: Murder Takes All (1989)
 Hound Town (1989)
 Flying Blind (1989)
 Cast the First Stone (1989)
 Dark Avenger (1990)
 Murder in Paradise (1990)   
 And the Sea Will Tell (1991)
 Switched at Birth (1991)
 The Whereabouts of Jenny (1991)
 Us (1991) 
 All in the Family: 20th Anniversary Special (1991)  
 Passion (1991)
 I Still Dream of Jeannie (1991)
 Christmas on Division Street (1991)
 Revolver (1992) 
 Journey to the Center of the Earth (1993)
 Barbarians at the Gate (1993)
 Miracle on Interstate 880 (1993)
 Hart to Hart Returns (1993)
 Hart to Hart: Home is Where the Hart Is (1994)
 The Cosby Mysteries (1994)  
 Hart to Hart: Crimes of the Hart (1994)
 Baby Brokers (1994)
 Hart to Hart: Old Friends Never Die (1994)
 Hart to Hart: Secrets of the Hart (1995)
 Hart to Hart: Secrets of the Hart (1995)
 Hart to Hart: Two Harts in 3/4 Time (1995)
 The Witching Hour (1996)
 Hart to Hart: Harts in High Season (1996)
 Hart to Hart: Till Death Do Us Hart (1996)
 Born Free: A New Adventure (1996) (co-production with Franklin/Waterman and Movieworld)
 For Hope (1996) (co-production with Brillstein-Grey Entertainment)
 Sudden Terror: The Hijacking of School Bus 17 (1996)
 Into Thin Air: Death on Everest (1997) (co-production with Sofronski Productions and Stillking Films)
 Medusa's Child (1997)  
 Crowned and Dangerous (1997)
 Final Descent (1997)  
 Bad As I Wanna Be: The Dennis Rodman Story (1998)
 The Long Island Incident (1998)
 Come On, Get Happy: The Partridge Family Story (1999)
 Double Platinum (1999)  
 A Memory in My Heart (1999)  
 Having Our Say: The Delany Sisters' First 100 Years (1999)
 Swing Vote (1999)  
 Blue Moon (1999)  
 First Daughter (1999)
 Final Run (1999)  
 A.T.F. (1999)
 Annie (1999) (co-production with Walt Disney Television, Chris Montan Productions and Storyline Entertainment)
 Beyond the Prairie: The True Story of Laura Ingalls Wilder (2000)
 The Three Stooges (2000) (co-production with Comedy III Productions, Icon Productions and Storyline Entertainment)
 A Father's Choice (2000)  
 Songs in Ordinary Time (2000)  
 Sole Survivor (2000)  
 Miracle on the Mountain: The Kincaid Family Story (2000)
 Picnic (2000)  
 Days of Our Lives' 35th Anniversary (2000)
 First Target (2000)
 The Beach Boys: An American Family (2000)
 The Crossing (2000)
 Shutterspeed (2000)  
 The Linda McCartney Story (2000)  
 These Old Broads (2001)  
 Call Me Claus (2001)  
 Brian's Song (2001)  
 The Princess and the Marine (2001)
 What Makes a Family (2001) 
 Kiss My Act (2001)
 Days of Our Lives' Christmas'  (2001)
 Midwives (2001) (co-production with Craig Anderson Productions)
 The Facts of Life Reunion (2001) (co-production with Walt Disney Television, Berger Queen Productions and Laurence Mark Productions)
 Beyond the Prairie, Part 2: The True Story of Laura Ingalls Wilder (2002)
 Two Against Time (2002) (co-production with Open Road Productions and Let's Pretend Productions)
 First Shot (2002) (co-production with Mandalay Television and Lionsgate Television)
 Dancing at the Harvest Moon (2002) (co-production with Bayonne Entertainment)
 Murder in Greenwich (2002)
 Martin and Lewis (2002)
 The Reagans (2003)
 Red Water (2003) (co-production with New Line Television)
 Lucy (2003)
 The Perfect Husband: The Laci Peterson Story (2004) (co-production with Modern Videofilm Inc., Sokolow Company and Stu Segall Productions)
 The Brooke Ellison Story (2004)
 Deceit (2004)
 Revenge of the Middle-Aged Woman (2004) (co-production with Dan Wigutow Productions)
 Suburban Madness (2004)
 Ike: Countdown to D-Day (2004)
 Raising Waylon (2004)
 The Hunt for the BTK Killer (2005)
 Faith of My Fathers (2005)
 Jesse Stone: Stone Cold (2005) (co-production with Brandman Productions)
 Jesse Stone: Night Passage (2006) (co-production with Brandman Productions)
 Not Like Everyone Else (2006)
 Touch the Top of the World (2006)
 Fatal Contact: Bird Flu in America (2006)
 Relative Chaos (2006)
 Wedding Wars (2006)
 Jesse Stone: Death in Paradise (2006) (co-production with Brandman Productions)
 Jesse Stone: Sea Change (2007)
 Kings of South Beach (2007)
 Comanche Moon (2008)
 A Raisin in the Sun (2008)
 Flirting with Forty (2008)
 America (2009)
 Jesse Stone: Thin Ice (2009)
 Gifted Hands: The Ben Carson Story (2009)
 Natalee Holloway (2009)
 Sundays at Tiffany's (2010)
 Who Is Clark Rockefeller? (2010)
 Jesse Stone: No Remorse (2010)
 The Craigslist Killer (2011)
 Justice for Natalee Holloway (2011)
 Jesse Stone: Innocents Lost (2011)
 Five (2011)
 Steel Magnolias (2012)
 Jesse Stone: Benefit of the Doubt (2012)
 Drew Peterson: Untouchable (2012)
 Aladdin and the Death Lamp (2012)
 Hannah's Law (2012)
 Left to Die (2012)  
 TalhotBlond (2012)
 Hatfields & McCoys  (2012)
 Blue Lagoon: The Awakening (2012)
 The Anna Nicole Story (2013)
 Call Me Crazy: A Five Film (2013)
 Divorce: A Love Story (2013)  
 Doubt (2013)  
 The Vatican (2013)
 Brenda Forever (2013)
 The Sound of Music Live! (2013) (with Storyline Entertainment and Universal Television)
 Jacked Up (2013)  
 Gaffigan (2013)  
 Bonnie & Clyde (2013)
 Irreversible (2014)
 Sea of Fire (2014)
 Bambi Cottages (2014)
 In My Dreams (2014)
 Wild Blue (2014) 
 Cuz-Bros (2014) 
 Outlaw Prophet: Warren Jeffs (2014)
 The Gabby Douglas Story (2014)
 Lizzie Borden Took an Ax (2014) 
 With This Ring (2015)
 Jesse Stone: Lost in Paradise (2015)
 Beautiful & Twisted (2015)
 Cleveland Abduction (2015)
 The Wiz Live! (2015) (co-production with Universal Television and Storyline Entertainment)
 A Christmas Melody (2015) (co-production with Brad Krevoy Television, Motion Picture Corporation of America and Hallmark Channel) 
 Mother, May I Sleep with Danger? (2016)
 Surviving Compton: Dre, Suge & Michel'le (2016) (co-production with ThinkFactory Media)
 Hairspray Live! (2016) (co-production with Warner Bros. Television, Universal Television, New Line Cinema and Storyline Entertainment)
 Real Life (2017)
 Distefano (2017)
 Flint (2017)
 Kansas City (2018)
 History of Them (2018)
 Jesus Christ Superstar Live in Concert (2018) (co-production with Universal Television, Storyline Entertainment and Marc Platt Productions)
 Ball Street (2018)
 Chiefs (2018)
 Love You to Death (2019)
 Very Valentine (2019) (co-production with The Sanitsky Company)
 Escaping the NXIVM Cult: A Mother's Fight to Save Her Daughter  (2019)
 25 (2019)
 El Camino: A Breaking Bad Movie (2019)
 Patsy & Loretta (2019)
 Chris Watts: Confessions of a Killer (2020) (co-production with Peace Out Productions)
 Poisoned Love: The Stacey Castor Story (2020) (co-production with Wishing Floor Films, Lighthouse Pictures and Frank Von Zerneck Films)
 Happy Endings Virtual Reunion (2020)
 Mariah Carey's Magical Christmas Special (2020) (distributor only for TV Syndication, with Apple, Inc. and WildBrain Distribution, on behalf of Peanuts Worldwide)
 Salt-N-Pepa (2021) (co-production with Flavor Unit Entertainment)
 The Long Island Serial Killer: A Mother's Hunt for Justice (2021) (co-production with Lighthouse Pictures and Happily Ever After Films)
 Secrets of a Marine's Life (2021) (co-production with Front Street Pictures and Peace Out Productions)
 Doomsday Mom: The Lori Vallow Story (2021) (co-production with EveryWhere Studios, Lighthouse Pictures and Peace Out Productions)
 Annie Live! (2021) (co-production with Chloe Productions, The Green Room and Zadan/Meron Productions)
 Days of Our Lives: A Very Salem Christmas (2021)
 A Christmas Spark (2022) (co-production with Lighthouse Pictures)
 Mariah Carey: Merry Christmas to All! (The TV Concert Special) (2022) (co-production with CBS Media Ventures, Sony Music Entertainment & Supply&Demand Productions)
 How to Murder Your Husband: The Nancy Brophy Story (2023) (co-production with Front Street Pictures and Peace Out Productions)

 TriStar Television 
 Werewolf (1987)
 Three on a Match (1987)
 Danger Down Under (1988)
 A Child Lost Forever: The Jerry Sherwood Story (1992)
 From the Files of Joseph Wambaugh: A Jury of One (1992) (co-production with Grossbart Barnett Productions)
 Stormy Weathers (1992)
 Trial: The Price of Passion (1992)
 Casualties of Love: The Long Island Lolita Story (1993)
 Fugitive Nights: Danger in the Desert (1993)
 Staying Afloat (1993)
 Boy Meets Girl (1993)
 Fallen Champ: The Untold Story of Mike Tyson (1993)
 Menendez: A Killing in Beverly Hills (1994)
 The Disappearance of Vonnie (1994)
 Next Door (1994)
 Sahara (1995)
 Pins and Needles (1995)
 Never Say Never: The Deidre Hall Story (1995)
 Abandoned and Deceived (1995)
 Serving in Silence: The Margarethe Cammermeyer Story (1995)
 Annie: A Royal Adventure! (1995; co-produced by Rastar Productions)
 To Sir, with Love II (1996)
 919 Fifth Avenue (1996)
 Mother, May I Sleep with Danger? (1996)
 Secrets of the Bermuda Triangle (1996)
 The Hunchback (1997) (distribution only)
 Intensity (1997)
 The Advocate's Devil (1997)
 Home Invasion (1997)

 Spelling-Goldberg Productions 
 The Daughters of Joshua Cabe (1972)
 No Place to Run (1972)
 Say Goodbye, Maggie Cole (1972)
 The Bounty Man (1972)
 Home for the Holidays (1972)
 A Cold Night's Death (1973)
 Snatched (1973)
 The Great American Beauty Contest (1973)
 The Bait (1973)
 The Letters (1973)
 Satan's School for Girls (1973)
 Hijack (1973)
 Letters from Three Lovers (1973)
 The Affair (1973)
 The Girl Who Came Gift-Wrapped (1974)
 The Death Squad (1974)
 Cry Panic (1974)
 Savages (1974)
 Death Sentence (1974)
 Hit Lady (1974)
 Death Cruise (1974)
 Only with Married Men (1974)
 The Daughters of Joshua Cabe Return (1975)
 Murder on Flight 502 (1975)
 The Legend of Valentino (1975)
 One of My Wives is Missing (1976)
 Charlie's Angels (1976)
 The New Daughters of Joshua Cabe (1976)
 Death at Love House (1976)
 33 Hours in the Life of God (1976)
 The Sad and Lonely Sundays (1976)
 The Boy in the Plastic Bubble (1976)
 Little Ladies of the Night (1977)
 Beach Patrol (1979)

 Embassy Communications 
 The Facts of Life Goes to Paris (1982)
 Eleanor, First Lady of the World (1982) 
 An Invasion of Privacy (1983)
 Grace Kelly (1983) 
 A Doctor's Story (1984)  
 Heartsounds (1984)  
 Kane & Abel (1985)
 Firefighter (1986)
 The Facts of Life Down Under (1987) (co-production with Crawford Productions)
 Guilty of Innocence: The Lenell Geter Story (1987)

 Embassy Row 
 Balls of Steel (2007)  
 Ellen's Really Big Show (2007)  
 20 Under 20: Transforming Tomorrow (2012) 
 Jerry Before Seinfeld (2017)

 Stellify Media 
 Space Truckers (2017)
 A Taste of Home (2018) (co-production with Alfo-Mic Productions)
 Barbershop for Bald Men (2021)
 Fast Food Face Off (2021)

Eleven Film
 Candid Cameron (2006)
 Make Me a Virgin (2007) (co-production with Nobles Gate)
 First Cut: Cyber-Skiving (2007)
 Being Maxine Carr (2008) (co-production with Renegade Pictures)
 The Murder of Billie-Jo (2008)
 Rick and Peter (2011)
 The Secret Life of the Pub (2015)
 Rotters (2015)

Gogglebox Entertainment
 The Untold Tommy Cooper (2011) (co-production with Noel Gay Television)
 Frankie Howerd: The Lost Tapes (2013)

 Left Bank Pictures 
 Loving Miss Hatto (2012)
 Oasis (2017) (co-production with Amazon Studios)
 Tommy Cooper: Not Like That, Like This (2014)
 Sitting in Limbo (2020)

 Silver River Productions 
 9/11: Out of the Blue (2006)
 638 Way to Kill Castro (2006)
 Fat Man's Warning (2007)
 The Million Pound Footballers' Giveaway (2007)
 Off by Heart (2009)
 One Night in Emergency (2010)
 Giles and Sue's Royal Wedding (2011)
 Sargeant on Spike (2012)
 Elizabeth Taylor: The Auction of a Lifetime (2012)
 Off by Heart: Shakespeare (2012)
 Sex Story: Fifty Shades of Grey (2012) (co-production with Mox Productions)
 The Smiths (2013)
 Conned, Fleeced and Left for Broke (2014)
 Caught with Their Fingers in the Till (2014)

 Electric Ray 
 How Rich Are You? (2014)
 News Crack (2018) (co-production with Mother's Best Child)

Sony Pictures Television Nonfiction
Sharp Entertainment
 Great Things About the Holidays (2005)
 Halloween's Most Extreme (2007)
 The iPod Revolution (2007)
 25 Biggest Real Estate Mistakes (2008)
 Extreme Mind-Blowing Hotels (2008)
 Extreme Ways to Go Green (2008)
 Buying and Selling: 20 Best Kept Secrets (2009)
 The Tragic Side of Comedy (2009)
 13 Scarier Movie Moments (2009)
 Fame and Recovery (2010)
 Extreme Couponing (2010)
 The Tragic Side of Fame (2011)
 Large, Dangerous, Rocket Ships (2011)
 Halloween Crazy (2011)
 Christmas Crazy (2011)
 Extreme Couponing Black Friday Blitz (2012)
 Extreme Couponing: Midnight Madness (2012)
 Extreme Couponing: Holiday Hauls (2012)
 Hollywood's Most Notorious Crimes (2012)
 Halloween Crazier (2012)
 Lost Magic Decoded (2012) (co-production with Peter Greenberg Worldwide)
 Christmas Crazier (2012)
 Instant Christmas (2012)
 JonBenet's Mother: Victim or Killer (2016)
 Germophobia (2021)

19 Entertainment
 Back to the 50's (1999) (co-production with Steelhead Productions)
 Boyfriends & Birthdays (1999) (co-production with Steelhead Productions)
 Artistic Differences (2000)
 World Idol (2003)
 Victoria Beckham: Coming to America (2007)
 Born in the USA (2007)
 Giving You Everything (2007)
 Santa Cruz (2010) (co-production with Factory Films)

B17 Entertainment
 #Graduation2020: Facebook and Instagram Celebrate the Class of 2020 (2020)
 TikTok LIVE New Years Eve (2020)

The Intellectual Property Corporation (IPC)
 Truth & Lies: The Crocodile of Wall Street? (2022)

 Sony Wonder Television 
 Mama, Do You Love Me? (1999)
 Little Witch (1999)
 Timothy Tweedle the First Christmas Elf'' (2000)

Notes

References 

Sony
Television series by Sony Pictures Television
Series